F.A.M.E. Tour may refer to:
F.A.M.E. Tour (Chris Brown)
F.A.M.E. Tour (Maluma)